Regina Albert Park was a constituency of the Legislative Assembly of Saskatchewan.

Representation 

 Kenneth Roy MacLeod (1971 to 1975)

References 

Former provincial electoral districts of Saskatchewan
Politics of Regina, Saskatchewan